The type–token distinction is the difference between naming a class (type) of objects and naming the individual instances (tokens) of that class. Since each type may be exemplified by multiple tokens, there are generally more tokens than types of an object. For example, the sentence "A rose is a rose is a rose" contains three word types: three word tokens of the type a, three word tokens of the type rose, and two word tokens of the type is. The distinction is important in disciplines such as logic, linguistics, metalogic, typography, and computer programming.

Overview
The type–token distinction separates types (abstract descriptive concepts) from tokens (objects that instantiate concepts). For example, in the sentence "the bicycle is becoming more popular" the word bicycle represents the abstract concept of bicycles, and is thus a type, whereas in the sentence "the bicycle is in the garage", it represents a particular object, and is therefore a token. Similarly, the word type 'letter' uses only four letter types: L, E, T and R. Nevertheless, it uses both E and T twice. One can say that the word type 'letter' has six letter tokens, with two tokens each of the letter types E and T. Whenever a word type is inscribed, the number of letter tokens created equals the number of letter occurrences in the word type.

Some logicians consider a word type to be the class of its tokens. Other logicians counter that the word type has a permanence and constancy not found in the class of its tokens. The type remains the same while the class of its tokens is continually gaining new members and losing old members.

The distinction in computer programming between classes and objects is related, though in this context, "class" sometimes refers to a set of objects (with class-level attribute or operations) rather than a description of an object in the set, as "type" would.

Typography 
In typography, the type–token distinction is used to determine the presence of a text printed by movable type:

Charles Sanders Peirce 
The distinctions between using words as types or tokens were first made by American logician and philosopher Charles Sanders Peirce in 1906 using terminology that he established. Peirce's type–token distinction applies to words, sentences, paragraphs, and so on: to anything in a universe of discourse of character-string theory, or concatenation theory.

Peirce's original words are the following.

See also 

 Class (philosophy)
 Formalism (philosophy)
 Haecceity
 Is-a
 Map–territory relation
 Mental model
 
 Use-mention distinction
 Type theory
 Type physicalism

References

Sources
Baggin J., and Fosl, P. (2003) The Philosopher's Toolkit. Blackwell: 171-73. .
Peper F., Lee J., Adachi S., Isokawa T. (2004) Token-Based Computing on Nanometer Scales, Proceedings of the ToBaCo 2004 Workshop on Token Based Computing, Vol.1 pp. 1–18.

External links 
 

Metalogic
Conceptual distinctions
Knowledge representation
Abstraction
Concepts in metaphysics
Articles containing video clips
Philosophy of logic
Philosophy of language
Linguistics
Charles Sanders Peirce